is a Japanese competitor in synchronized swimming.

She won three bronze medals at the 2015 World Aquatics Championships as well as two silver medals at the 2014 Asian Games. She also won two silver medals at the 2013 Summer Universiade.

References
Asian Games Profile

Living people
Japanese synchronized swimmers
1992 births
World Aquatics Championships medalists in synchronised swimming
Sportspeople from Osaka Prefecture
Artistic swimmers at the 2014 Asian Games
Asian Games medalists in artistic swimming
Synchronized swimmers at the 2015 World Aquatics Championships
Synchronized swimmers at the 2016 Summer Olympics
Synchronized swimmers at the 2017 World Aquatics Championships
Olympic synchronized swimmers of Japan
Olympic bronze medalists for Japan
Olympic medalists in synchronized swimming
Medalists at the 2016 Summer Olympics
Asian Games silver medalists for Japan
Medalists at the 2014 Asian Games
Universiade medalists in synchronized swimming
Medalists at the 2018 Asian Games
Artistic swimmers at the 2018 Asian Games
Universiade silver medalists for Japan
Artistic swimmers at the 2019 World Aquatics Championships
Medalists at the 2013 Summer Universiade
21st-century Japanese women